James Cerretani and Adil Shamasdin were the defending champions but lost in the semifinals.
Marin Draganja and Mate Pavić won the title by defeating Samuel Groth and John-Patrick Smith 5–7, 6–2, [13–11] in the final.

Seeds

Draw

Draw

References
 Main Draw

Jalisco Open - Doubles
2013 Doubles